Mahendra Singh Mewar (born 24 February 1941) is an Indian politician who was a Member of Parliament in the Lok Sabha. He is the eldest son of Maharana Bhagwat Singh Mewar. Mahendra and his brother Arvind both claim to be the 76th custodian of the House of Mewar. Maharanas of Udaipur are considered not rulers but custodians of the kingdom on behalf of Sri Eklingji (Lord Shiva).

Business and political career

Mahendra was elected to the Lok Sabha from Chittorgarh in the 1989 Indian general election from BJP with a record winning margin of over 190,000 votes. He is the eldest son of Mewar ruler Bhagwat Singh. He graduated from Mayo College, Ajmer where he was a sportsman.

During the lifetime of Late Maharana Bhagwat Singh ji Mewar, Mahendra Singh ji Mewar assisted in the formation of the Maharana Mewar Charitable Foundation, managed the world-famous Lake Palace Hotel when it was first recognised as a five-star hotel and managed the Garden Hotel, also at Udaipur when it was accorded with a three-star status.

Personal life 

Mahendra Singh is married to Princess Nirupama Kumari of Tehri Garhwal. Mahendra Singh ji Mewar has one son, Maharajkumar Vishvaraj Singh of Udaipur - Mewar (he has one daughter and one son), and a daughter, Kanwrani Trivikrama Kumari Jamwal.

There has been some controversy between branches of the family about the leadership of the House of Mewar and the subsequently the holder of the custodianship. The lines are between Arvind Singh Mewar on the one hand and Mahendra Singh on the other.

Dispute over succession

In 1984, Maharana Bhagwat Singh willed his entire property through a trust to younger son Arvind. He not only made Arvind the executor of the will, but also included daughter Yogeshwari Kumari as a trustee. Elder son Mahendra Singh, who had a year before accused his father of wasteful expenditure, polygamy and sought division of the vast property, was left out.

However, after the demise of Late Maharana Bhagwat Singh ji Mewar of Udaipur, as his eldest son, Maharana Mahendra Singhji Mewar was 'Crowned' the Maharana of Mewar -76th Custodian of the Shrine, in a Raj Tilak ceremony on 19 November 1984, with the religious ceremonies and public participation within the City Palace, Udaipur, and thereafter the procession and "darshan" before Shri Eklingji at Kailashpuri.

His younger brother, Shri Arvind Singh Mewar has since however, claimed that he is the Head of the Family. The Estate of Late Maharana Bhagwat Singh ji Mewar of Udaipur has been declared a H.U.F (Hindu United Family - Joint Family) by the Income Tax Tribunal in 1981 and is subject to a partition suit since 1983. Stay orders have been applicable on this Estate since and the activities initiated, expanded, alterations undertaken by Shri Arvind Singh Mewar have been during the pendency of these orders.

Shri Arvind Singh's place of residence is Shikarbadi. On the demise of Late Maharana Bhagwat Singh ji Mewar of Udaipur, parts of the Palace, specifically those in which Late Maharana Bhagwat Singh ji Mewar of Udaipur was residing were sealed by Mahendra Singh ji Mewar. Against orders of the High Court of Rajasthan, the government / administration handed over these parts to Shri Arvind Singh for which a contempt petition is under adjudication before the Supreme Court of India. Mahendra Singh ji Mewar has been permitted by the Supreme Court of India to take steps to repossess these parts of the Palace. It is under these circumstances that Shri Arvind Singh has been residing in the City Palace.

The relationship between the two branches of the family have remained tense. While in the international press, Arvind Singh Mewar is mentioned as the current head of the family, the local old noble families of Udaipur recognise Maharana Mahendra Singhji Mewar as the rightful head.

See also
 Mewar
 Arvind Singh Mewar

References

External links 
9th Lok Sabha - Members Bioprofile
Mewar Muddle 

1941 births
India MPs 1989–1991
Bharatiya Janata Party politicians from Rajasthan
Living people
Mewar dynasty
People from Udaipur
Lok Sabha members from Rajasthan
Indian royalty
History of Udaipur
People from Chittorgarh district